Huron University may refer to:

 Huron University College, London, Ontario, Canada (founded 1863), a component institution of the University of Western Ontario
 Huron University, Huron, South Dakota, US (1883–2005) a defunct university
 Huron University USA in London, London, England, UK (1989–2008) a defunct university, formerly called "Huron University" (2001-2008)

See also
 University (disambiguation)
 Huron (disambiguation)
 Huron College (disambiguation)